Pachakutiq (Quechua pacha time, space, kuti return, "return of time", "change of time", pacha kuti "great change or disturbance in the social or political order", -q a suffix, Pachakutiq an Inca emperor, Hispanicized spelling Pachacutec) is a  mountain in the Andes of Peru. It is located southeast of Lake Salinas in the Arequipa Region, Arequipa Province, Tarucani District, and in the Moquegua Region, General Sánchez Cerro Province, Coalaque District. Pachakutiq lies northwest of Q'uwa Laki and Qillqata.

See also 
 Takuni

References

Mountains of Peru
Mountains of Arequipa Region
Mountains of Moquegua Region